Folly and Glory (2004) is a novel by Larry McMurtry. It is the fourth and last, both in chronological and publishing order, of The Berrybender Narratives.  Set in the years 1835 and 1836, it completes the Berrybenders' North American adventure by sending them from Santa Fe to the disease-ridden and war-torn wilderness of New Mexico and Texas.  Many characters are caught up in a whirlwind of death, madness, and bitter remorse.

The title refers to the shortsightedness of the Berrybenders and their friends, and to the courage with which most of them face the consequences.

2004 American novels
Novels by Larry McMurtry
Western (genre) novels

Novels set in New Mexico
Novels set in Texas
The Berrybender Narratives
Fiction set in 1835
Fiction set in 1836